François Sauvadet (born 20 April 1953) is a French journalist and politician of the Union of Democrats and Independents (UDI) who has been serving as the president of the Côte-d'Or department in eastern France since 2008.

Early career
Sauvadet worked as a journalist at regional daily newspaper Le Bien Public from 1977 until 1993.

Political career
Sauvadet represented Côte-d'Or's 4th constituency in the French National Assembly from 1993 to 2016, when he resigned to focus on activities in regional politics.

Over the course of his career in national politics, Sauvadet served as the chair of the New Centre's parliamentary group from 2007 to 2011 and as Minister for the Civil Service in the government of Prime Minister François Fillon from 2011 to 2012. Ahead of the 2012 French presidential election, he endorsed Nicolas Sarkozy as the center-right parties' joint candidate. In 2012, he was one of the founders of the Union of Democrats and Independents (UDI).

References

External links 
 Official website 

1953 births
Living people
Politicians from Dijon
Republican Party (France) politicians
Liberal Democracy (France) politicians
Union for French Democracy politicians
The Centrists politicians
Democratic European Force politicians
Government ministers of France
20th-century French journalists
Deputies of the 10th National Assembly of the French Fifth Republic
Deputies of the 11th National Assembly of the French Fifth Republic
Deputies of the 12th National Assembly of the French Fifth Republic
Deputies of the 13th National Assembly of the French Fifth Republic
Deputies of the 14th National Assembly of the French Fifth Republic
Union of Democrats and Independents politicians
Regional councillors of Bourgogne-Franche-Comté